Penycloddiau is a hill in Flintshire, Wales, and one of five Marilyns in the Clwydian Range.

The hill, like Foel Fenlli and Moel Arthur to the south, has an Iron Age hillfort at its summit.  It covers  making it one of the largest hillforts in Wales. In 2017, excavations by the Clywdian Range Archaeology Group (CRAG) unearthed a significant number of 4,000-year-old stone tools from the Bronze Age, the discovery indicates human activity occurred much earlier than first thought in the area.

Penycloddiau is crossed by the Offa's Dyke Path and the Clwydian Way, two long distance footpaths that traverse the hills in this area. A free car park exists at the bwlch between Penycloddiau and Moel Arthur, where two footpaths lead to the summit.


See also
List of hillforts in Wales

References

Further reading

External links
 www.geograph.co.uk : photos of Penycloddiau and surrounding area

Marilyns of Wales
Hillforts in Flintshire
History of Flintshire
Mountains and hills of Flintshire